The Battle of Lukigura was fought during the East African Campaign of World War I.

References

Battles of the East African Campaign
Battles of World War I involving Germany